Rear Admiral The Honourable Edward Barry Stewart Bingham VC, OBE (26 July 1881 – 24 September 1939) served in the Royal Navy during the First World War and was awarded the Victoria Cross for his actions in engaging the German fleet during the Battle of Jutland.

Military career
The third son of Lord Clanmorris, Edward Bingham was born in Bangor Castle, County Down, Ireland. Educated at Arnold House and in HMS Britannia, he entered the Royal Navy in 1895 as an acting sub-lieutenant. He was confirmed as a sub-lieutenant 15 March 1901.

On 31 May 1916, during the Battle of Jutland off Denmark, Commander Bingham was in command of a destroyer division. He led his division in their attack, first on enemy destroyers and then on the battle cruisers of the German High Seas Fleet. Once the enemy was sighted Bingham ordered his own destroyer, and the one remaining destroyer of his division, to close to within 2,750 meters of the opposing battle fleet so that he could bring his torpedoes to bear. While making this attack Nestor and Nicator were under concentrated fire of the secondary batteries of the German fleet and Nestor was subsequently sunk. For his actions, Bingham earned the Victoria Cross, one of relatively few awarded for naval bravery during World War I.

Bingham was picked up by the Germans at Jutland, and remained a prisoner of war (latterly at Holzminden) until the Armistice. After the war, he remained with the Royal Navy and retired as a Rear Admiral in 1932. He was made an Officer of the Order of the British Empire. Bingham died in 1939 and is buried in the Golders Green cemetery in northwest London.

Family 
In 1915, Bingham married Vera Patterson; they had a son and a daughter. The marriage was dissolved in 1937.

Victoria Cross medal
Bingham's Victoria Cross was auctioned by Sotheby's in 1983 and was purchased by the North Down Borough Council, County Down, who outbid a Canadian millionaire. It is on display at the North Downs Museum in Bangor Castle.

Bingham's Victoria Cross and his Order of St Stanislaus medal were both stolen by an opportunist thief in the mid 1990s. He was quickly caught and when the items were valued with help from the Imperial War Museum, at tens of thousands of pounds. The thief was charged with a major theft.

References

 The Register of the Victoria Cross (1981, 1988 and 1997)
 
 Ireland's VCs (Dept of Economic Development, 1995)
 Monuments to Courage (David Harvey, 1999)
 Irish Winners of the Victoria Cross (Richard Doherty & David Truesdale, 2000)

External links

 
 Location of grave and VC medal (Golders Green)
 Commander Bingham's action at the Battle of Jutland Imperial War Museums

1881 births
1939 deaths
Irish sailors in the Royal Navy
Anglicans from Northern Ireland
20th-century Anglo-Irish people
Royal Navy rear admirals
Irish World War I recipients of the Victoria Cross
Officers of the Order of the British Empire
British World War I prisoners of war
Royal Navy recipients of the Victoria Cross
World War I prisoners of war held by Germany
Royal Navy officers of World War I
People from Bangor, County Down
Younger sons of barons
People educated at Arnold House School
Military personnel from County Down